The Roman Catholic Diocese of Tandag (Lat: Dioecesis Tandagensis) is a diocese of the Latin Church of the  Roman Catholic Church in the Philippines.

Erected in 1978, the diocese was created from territory in the Diocese of Surigao.

The diocese has experienced no jurisdictional changes, and is a suffragan of the Archdiocese of Cagayan de Oro.

On 26 February 2018, Pope Francis named Raul B. Dael, Vicar for the Clergy of the Archdiocese of Cagayan de Oro as the bishop of Tandag replacing Nereo P. Odchimar after reaching the mandatory age of retirement was accepted by Pope Francis.

Coat of Arms

On top, on a blue / azure field symbolizing fidelity and truth, the crucifix with intertwined lily, a loaf of bread on a plate, and the star—all depicted proper—atttributes of St. Nicholas of Tolentino, principal patron of the Diocese. To the left of the attributes, the blessing hand with brown glove, depicted proper, an allusion to Padre San Pio of Pietrelcina, secondary patron of the Diocese.
On base, on a green / vert field symbolizing hope and lush vegetation, the heraldic symbol for mountains in gold / or, symbolizing the rich resources of the Province of Surigao del Sur. The symbol alludes to the Diwata mountain range located in the Province. Beneath is the heraldic symbol for water in blue / azure, symbolizing the Philippine Sea, the body of water bordering the coastline of the Province.

Ordinaries

See also

Catholic Church in the Philippines

References

Tandag
Tandag
Christian organizations established in 1978
Roman Catholic dioceses and prelatures established in the 20th century
Religion in Surigao del Sur